On 3 July 2022, a serac collapsed on the mountain of Marmolada, in the Dolomites at the regional border between Trentino and Veneto, Italy. Eleven people were killed and eight were wounded. The large-scale collapse of the serac led to one of the most serious accidents in the Alps in recent decades.

Background 

Serac collapse
On the afternoon of 3 July, around 13:45, a massive avalanche was triggered by a serac that collapsed due to the high temperatures, which reached 10 °C the day before the tragedy. At an elevation of 2800 metres, the lower end of a glacier snapped off. The break-off had a width of 80 metres and a height of 25 metres approximately. The detached volume was estimated to be 65,000 ± 10,000 cubic meters. The ice and rock masses fell several hundred metres down the northern slope onto the hiking trail passing below to the summit and on to just before the Fedaia reservoir about 1.5 kilometres away. The hiking trail was heavily frequented due to the time in the early afternoon of a summer Sunday.

The mountain rescuers described the event as an extraordinary incident that could not be compared to a normal avalanche. According to initial assumptions, the extremely high temperatures of the previous days were a factor leading to the accident. On the summit of the mountain, 10 °C had been measured the day before the accident. In addition, much less precipitation than usual had fallen in the previous winter, so the glacier lacked an insulating layer of snow as protection against the sun and the high temperatures. Reinhold Messner saw the accident as a consequence of climate change. In an initial assessment, glaciologist Georg Kaser also assumed that meltwater had penetrated the glacier and accumulated underneath it, ultimately serving as a lubricant for the ice masses.

Rescuers used thermal drones to search for possible survivors shortly after the collapse with survivors being flown off the mountainside by helicopters.

Victims 
At least five distinct rope teams were involved in the collapse, which killed eleven mountaineers and injured eight more. Nine of the victims (six men, including two mountain guides, and three women) were Italian (all but one hailing from Veneto), two were Czech. Six bodies were recovered in the immediate aftermath of the collapse, a seventh on the following day, two more three days after the collapse, and a further two on the fourth day. The remains of the eleventh and final victim were identified through DNA testing on 9 July.

Eight injured mountaineers, six Italians and two Germans, were rescued at the site of the disaster and hospitalized in the hospitals of Trento (a 27-year-old Italian man, a 29-year-old Italian woman, a 33-year-old Italian man and a 51-year-old Italian woman), Treviso (a 30-year-old Italian man), Feltre (a 67-year-old German man), Belluno (a 58-year-old German woman) and Cavalese, two of whom were in critical condition.

Aftermath 
Veneto regional governor Luca Zaia, reported that the Alpine rescue unit shared an emergency number for people to call if their loved ones had not returned from excursions on the mountain.

The day after the accident, Italian Prime Minister Mario Draghi visited the town of Canazei, where the rescue forces' operations centre was located. President Sergio Mattarella and other senior politicians expressed their condolences, and Pope Francis responded with a call to "find new ways conscious of humanity and nature" in the face of climate change.

See also
 Marmolada Glacier
 Weather of 2022
 White Friday (1916)

References

2022 disasters in Italy
2022 meteorology
2022 natural disasters
2020s avalanches
July 2022 events in Italy
Avalanches in Italy
Mountaineering disasters
History of Trentino
History of Veneto
Marmolada